Scott Beatty is an American author, comic book writer, and superhero historian actively published since the late 1990s. He is an alumnus of Juniata College and Iowa State University.

Biography
Scott Beatty (also credited as "Scott M. Beatty," "Scott Matthew Beatty," and "Scotty Beatty)" has authored hundreds of adventures for many of comics’ most iconic characters including Batman and Robin tales for DC Comics, as well as The Phantom, Buck Rogers, and Sherlock Holmes for Dynamite Entertainment. 

Beatty has also contributed comic book stories to Antarctic Press, Crossgen Comics, Dark Horse Comics, IDW Publishing, and Marvel Entertainment. 

With Chuck Dixon, Beatty co-wrote the critically acclaimed and best-selling Robin: Year One, Batgirl: Year One, Nightwing: Year One, and Joker: Last Laugh miniseries for DC. Beatty’s and Dixon's Batgirl: Year One—the middle arc of their Batman “Sidekick Trifecta” at DC—was named Best Miniseries of 2003 by Wizard: The Comics Magazine and is considered the definitive Batgirl origin story. In 2009, Batgirl Year One was adapted into a nine-episode Motion Comic featuring animation voiceover actress Kate Higgins in the role of Barbara Gordon/Batgirl.  It was later made available as a DVD alongside a Motion Comic of Batman Adventures: Mad Love featuring Harley Quinn. On its 20th Anniversary, DC Comics will release an all-new softcover collection of Batgirl: Year One on September 26th, 2023.

Beatty's "Regnum Defende"—a two-part *Year One* styled origin of Batman's valet Alfred Pennyworth as an agent of the British Secret Service—was one of the stories which inspired the recent Pennyworth streaming television series that lasted three seasons beginning on Hulu and concluding its run on HBOMax.

In addition to his comics work, Beatty has authored more than a dozen encyclopedic books about superheroes including DC Comics' Batman, Superman, Wonder Woman, Catwoman, Justice League of America, and Marvel’s Avengers. Beatty's “Ultimate Guides” for UK publisher Dorling-Kindersley in the early 2000s defined the standard for all genre character and movie guidebooks to follow. Beatty’s technically accurate The Batman Handbook, a literal guidebook on how to be the Dark Knight, was a top-selling title for Quirk Books.

Outside of comic books, Beatty has written G.I. Joe and Transformers animation for Hasbro, Inc.

Before he became a full-time freelance writer, Beatty launched ToyFare magazine as its founding Editor for Wizard Entertainment and guided it through its first two years of publication.

Beatty’s novels have included prose adaptations of his own Sherlock Holmes: Year One (Dynamite), in addition to the young readers hardcover Batman: Scarecrow’s Panic Plot (DC/Capstone) and Tron Uprising: The Junior Novel (Disney).

More recently, Beatty’s Loot Crate exclusive Star Wars Adventures: Destroyer Down graphic novel was the top selling comic book of 2017 with nearly a half-million copies shipped to LC subscribers.

In his role as superhero and pop culture scholar, Scott has appeared on E! Entertainment Television and Prism Films documentaries, and is a frequent guest on comic book, graphic novel, and superhero podcasts. He is frequently called upon to write introductions and essays for superhero books and collected editions. Beatty most recently wrote the foreword for DC Comics' Batman in the Silver Age Omnibus Volume 1.

Animation 
Beatty's animation writing credits include the following webisodes first aired on Hasbro internet sites, including "The Hub":

Hasbro Inc. 

G.I. Joe: Operations H.I.S.S. Episodes 1-9 (Kunoichi/Steelehouse - 2010)
G.I. Joe: Operations H.I.S.S. Spotlight Episodes 1-4 (Kunoichi/Steelehouse - 2010 - Duke & Ripcord, Scarlett, Zartan, and The Baroness)
Transformers: Cyber Missions Episodes 1-13 (TG Studios - 2010)

Bibliography 
Beatty's writing credits include a variety of superhero encyclopedias, children's books, and young adult offerings:

Capstone 

Batman: Scarecrow's Panic Plot (2015)
Batman: Le Terrible Projet de L'épouvantail (French Edition 2016)

Chronicle Books 

The DC Comics Action Figure Archive (w/ photographs by Marc Witz)

Disney Press 

Tron Uprising: The Junior Novel

Dorling Kindersley 
Avengers: The Ultimate Guide to Earth's Mightiest Heroes (Co-Author - 2012)
Avengers: The Essential Guide (April 2018 Loot Crate Exclusive Special Edition / Co-Author)
Batman: The Animated Series Guide
Batman: The Ultimate Guide to the Dark Knight (2001)
Batman: The Ultimate Guide to the Dark Knight - Updated Edition (2005)
Batman Begins: The Visual Guide 
Batman Beyond: The Animated Series Guide 
Catwoman: The Visual Guide to the Feline Fatale 
The DC Comics Encyclopedia: The Definitive Guide to the Characters of the DC Universe (Co-Author - 2004)
The DC Comics Encyclopedia: The Definitive Guide to the Characters of the DC Universe - Updated and Expanded (2008)
The DC Comics Encyclopedia: The Definitive Guide to the Characters of the DC Universe - All-New Edition (2016)
The DC Comics Encyclopedia: The Definitive Guide to the Characters of the DC Universe - New Edition (2021)
The DC Comics Encyclopedia: The Definitive Guide to the Characters of the DC Universe (2022)
JLA: The Ultimate Guide to the Justice League of America
Superman: The Animated Series Guide
Superman: The Ultimate Guide to the Man of Steel (2002)
Superman: The Ultimate Guide to the Man of Steel - Updated Edition (2006)
Wonder Woman: The Ultimate Guide to the Amazon Princess

Dorling Kindersley Foreign Editions 

 Avengers: Die Grossten Superhelden Aller Zeiten (German Edition)
 Avengers: Le Guide Ultime (French Edition)
 Batman: Die Welt Des Dunklen Ritters (German Edition)
 JLA: Die Gerechtigkeitsliga (HuGerman Edition)

Dynamite Entertainment 

Sir Arthur Conan Doyle's Sherlock Holmes: Year One 
Sir Arthur Conan Doyle's Sherlock Holmes: Year One / Year Two Two-Pack (w/ Brandon Jerwa)

Insight Editions 

Incredibuilds - Marvel's Captain America: Civil War - Iron Man Signature Series Book and Model Set
Marvel Comics: Mini Book of Heroes
Marvel Comics: Mini Book of Villains

Insight Editions Foreign Editions 

Marvel Comics: Les Heros (Huginn & Muginn - French Edition)
Marvel Comics: Les Vilains (Huginn & Muginn - French Edition)

Quirk Books 

The Batman Handbook: The Ultimate Training Manual
The Batman Handbook: The Ultimate Training Manual - バットマンハンドブック (Japanese Edition - 2005)
The Superman Handbook: The Ultimate Guide to Saving the Day

Comicography 
Beatty's writing credits include hundreds of stories from the following publishers:

Antarctic Press 
Beatty's writing credits for Antarctic Press include the following:
UNPrepped #1-5 (Creator-owned 5-issue miniseries with Chuck Dixon)

Crossgen Comics 
Beatty's writing credits for Crossgeneration Comics include the following:

Ruse #10-26

Crossgen Comics Collected Editions 
Edge #7-12 (Crossgen Compendia Series - Collects Ruse #10-16)
Ruse - Volume Two: The Silent Partner Trade Paperback
Crossgen Comics Deutschland (German Language Reprints)
Ruse #4-9

Dark Horse Comics 
Beatty's writing credits for Dark Horse Comics include the following:

Star Wars Tales #13

Dark Horse Comics Collected Editions 

 Star Wars Tales Volume 4 (Collects Star Wars Tales #13 - "Puzzle Peace")

DC Comics 
Beatty's solo and collaborate writing credits for DC Comics and its Wildstorm imprint include the following:

Amazing Adventures of the JLA
Aquaman Secret Files & Origins #1
Batgirl: Year One #1-9 (with Chuck Dixon)
Batman 80-Page Giant #2
Batman Begins: The Official Comics Adaptation
Batman Secret Files & Origins #1
Batman Villains Secret Files & Origins #1
Batman: Day of Judgment #1
Batman: Gotham City Secret Files & Origins #1
Batman: Gotham Knights #33-49
Batman: Legends of the Dark Knight Special #1
Batman: No Man's Land Secret Files & Origins #1
The Batman Chronicles #16-17, 20
The Batman Strikes! #27, 32
Beware the Batman #3
Birds of Prey Secret Files & Origins #1
Cartoon Network Action Pack! #54, 56-57, 61
Countdown to Final Crisis #37-32, 30-28, 25-2
Day of Judgment Secret Files & Origins #1
DC Comics Presents: Harley Quinn #1
DC Comics Presents: Young Justice #2
DC Nation FCBD Super Sampler 2013: Beware the Batman / Teen Titans Go!
DC Nation Super Spectacular #2
DCU Holiday Bash III
DCU Villains Secret Files & Origins #1
Detective Comics #806-807 (Alfred Pennyworth "Regnum Defende" Back-Up Feature Parts One and Two)
The Flash Secret Files & Origins #1
Gen13 #21-32
Golden Age Secret Files & Origins #1
Green Arrow #22, 33
Green Lantern 80-Page Giant #3
Green Lantern Secret Files & Origins #1-3
Green Lantern: Circle of Fire - Green Lantern / Power Girl #1
Guide to the DC Universe 2000 Secret Files & Origins #1
Guide to the DC Universe 2001-2002 Secret Files & Origins #1
JLA #59 (JOKER: LAST LAUGH Tie-in with Chuck Dixon)
JLA Secret Files & Origins #2-3
JLA/JSA Secret Files & Origins #1
Joker: Last Laugh #1-6 (with Chuck Dixon)
Joker: Last Laugh Secret Files & Origins #1 (with Chuck Dixon)
JSA Classified #19-20
JSA Secret Files & Origins #1
Justice League: Unstoppable Forces #1 (General Mills Cereal Pack-In - Over 4 million copies sold!)
Legion of Super-Heroes in the 31st Century #3, 9
Nightwing #101-106 (Nightwing: Year One story arc with Chuck Dixon)Nightwing Secret Files & Origins #1
New Gods Secret Files & Origins #1
Number of the Beast #1-8
Robin #88-91 (with Chuck Dixon)
Robin: Year One #1-4 (with Chuck Dixon)
Scooby-Doo, Where Are You? #5, 19, 22
Secret Files and Origins Guide to the DC Universe 2000 #1
Sins of Youth Secret Files & Origins #1
The Silver Age Secret Files & Origins #1
Snakes on a Plane #1-2 (Official Movie Adaptation - Ghost-Written with Chuck Dixon)
Son of Vulcan #1-6
Superboy #77 (with Karl Kesel)
Superman 80-Page Giant #2 (with Chuck Dixon)
Superman Secret Files & Origins #1-2
Superman / Batman Secret Files & Origins #1
Superman: Our Worlds at War Secret Files & Origins #1
Superman: Metropolis Secret Files & Origins #1
Titans Secret Files & Origins #1
Wildstorm: Revelations #1-6 (with Christos Gage)
Young Justice in No Man's Land Special #1 (with Chuck Dixon)
Young Justice Secret Files & Origins #1
Young Justice: Sins of Youth Secret Files & Origins #1

DC Comics Collected Editions 
Batgirl: A Celebration of 50 Years Hardcover (Collects Batgirl: Year One #4 - "Cave Dwellers")
Batgirl: Year One Trade Paperback (with Chuck Dixon)
Batgirl: Year One - The Deluxe Edition Hardcover (with Chuck Dixon)
Batgirl/Robin: Year One Trade Paperback (with Chuck Dixon)
Batman Allies: Alfred Pennyworth Trade Paperback
Batman Begins: The Movie & Other Tales of the Dark Knight Trade Paperback
Batman Versus Bane Trade Paperback
Batman: Joker's Last Laugh Trade Paperback (with Chuck Dixon)
Batman: No Man's Land Volume 1 Trade Paperback
Batman: No Man's Land Volume 2 Trade Paperback
Batman: No Man's Land Volume 3 Trade Paperback
Batman: No Man's Land Omnibus Volume 1 Hardcover
Batman: The Greatest Stories Ever Told - Volume Two Trade Paperback
Batman in the Silver Age Omnibus Volume 1 Hardcover (Foreword)
Ben 10 Classics Volume 4: Beauty and the Ben Trade Paperback
Ben 10 Classics Volume 5: Powerless Trade Paperback
Beware the Batman Volume 1 Trade Paperback
The Brave and the Bold - The Bronze Age Omnibus Volume 3 Hardcover (Foreword)
Cartoon Network 2-in-1: Ben 10 Ultimate Alien / Generator Rex Trade Paperback
Day of Judgment Trade Paperback
DC Universe: Origins Trade Paperback
The Flash by Mark Waid: Book Seven Trade Paperback
Gen13: World's End Trade Paperback
Green Lantern: Circle of Fire Trade Paperback
Green Lantern: Circle of Fire Trade Paperback (2021 Edition)
Harley Quinn's Greatest Hits Trade Paperback
JLA Volume Five Trade Paperback
JLA Volume Nine: Terror Incognito Trade Paperback
The Legion of Super-Heroes in the 31st Century: Tomorrow's Heroes Trade Paperback
Necessary Evil: Super-Villains of DC Comics Trade Paperback
Nightwing: A Darker Shade of Justice Trade Paperback
Nightwing: Year One Trade Paperback (with Chuck Dixon)
Nightwing: Year One - The Deluxe Edition Hardcover (with Chuck Dixon)
Number of the Beast Trade Paperback
Orion Omnibus Hardcover 
Robin, The Boy Wonder: A Celebration of 75 Years  Hardcover (Collects Nightwing #101 - "Only Robins Have Wings")
Robin: The Teen Wonder Trade Paperback
Robin: Year One Trade Paperback (with Chuck Dixon)
Robin: Year One Trade Paperback (with Chuck Dixon - 2nd Edition)
Robin: Year One - The Deluxe Edition Hardcover (with Chuck Dixon)
Scooby-Doo, Where Are You? Trade Paperback
Superman/Batman Omnibus Volume 1 Trade Paperback
Superman vs. Darkseid Trade Paperback
Wildstorm: Revelations Trade Paperback
Young Justice Volume Two Trade Paperback
Young Justice Volume Three Trade Paperback

DC Comics Foreign Language Editions 

Batman: Niemandsland - Band 2 (Panini - German)
Batman: Niemandsland - Band 3 (Panini - German)
Batgirl: Year One (Eaglemoss - UK English)
Batgirl: Annee Un - Parte 1 (Eaglemoss - French)
Batgirl: Annee Un - Parte 2 (Eaglemoss - French)
Batgirl: Annee Un (Urban Comics - French)
Batgirl: Ano Um (Eaglemoss - Portuguese)
Batgirl: Ano Um (Norma Editorial - Portuguese)
Batgirl: Ano Uno (Eaglemoss - Spanish)
Batgirl: Ano Uno (ECC - Spanish)
Batgirl: Ano Uno Pocket Book (ECC - Spanish - Digest-Sized Edition)
Batgirl: Ano Uno (Norma Editorial - Spanish)
Batgirl: Ano Uno (Planeta De Agostini - Spanish)
Batgirl: Anno Uno (Eaglemoss - Italian)
Batgirl: Anno Uno (Panini - Italian)
Batgirl: Anno Uno (Planeta De Agostini - Italian)
Batgirl: Das Erste Jahr (Eaglemoss - German)
Batgirl: Elso Uvad (Eaglemoss - Hungarian)
Batgirl: Rok Jedna (Eaglemoss - Czechoslovakian)
Batgirl: Rok Pierwszy (Eaglemoss - Polish)
Gen13: World's End - 5 (Norma Editorial - Spanish)
Gen13: World's End - 6 (Norma Editorial - Spanish)
Joker: Last Laugh (Titan - UK English)
Joker: Last Laugh (ShoPro - Japanese)
Joker: L'Ultima Risata (Planeta De Agostini - Italian)
Joker: Quien Rie El Ultimo Volumes 1-2 (ECC - Spanish)
Joker: Quien Rie El Ultimo DC Coleccion Heroes y Villanos (ECC - Spanish)
Joker: Wer Zuletz Lacht (Panini - German)
Nightwing: Year One (Eaglemoss - UK English)
Nightwing: Ano Uno (Eaglemoss - Spanish)
Nightwing: Ano Uno (ECC - Spanish)
Nightwing: Ano Uno (Planeta De Agostini- Spanish)
Nightwing: Anno Uno (Eaglemoss - Italian)
Nightwing: Anno Uno (DC Library - Panini Direct - Italian)
Nightwing: Asa Noturna Ano Um (Eaglemoss - Portuguese)
Nightwing: Das Erste Jahr (Eaglemoss - German)
Number of the Beast (Norma Editorial - Spanish)
Robin: Year One (Eaglemoss - UK English)
Robin: Year One (ShoPro - Japanese)
Robin: Year One (Titan - UK English)
Robin: Annee Un (Eaglemoss - French)
Robin: Annee Un (Urban Comics - French)
Robin: Ano Um (Eaglemoss - Portuguese)
Robin: Ano Uno (Eaglemoss - Spanish)
Robin: Ano Uno (ECC - Spanish)
Robin: Anno Uno (Panini - Italian)
Robin: Anno Uno (Planeta De Agostini - Italian)
Robin: Az Elso Ev (Eaglemoss - Hungarian)
Robin: Das Erste Jahr (Eaglemoss - German)
Robin: Rok Jedna (Eaglemoss - Czechoslovakian)
Robin: Rok Pierwszy (Eaglemoss - Polish)
Wildstorm: Apocalisse (Magic Press Comics - Italian)
Wildstorm: Revelations (Norma Editorial - Spanish)

Dynamite Entertainment 
Beatty's writing credits for Dynamite Entertainment include the following:

Bionic Man Annual #1
Buck Rogers #0-12
The Last Phantom #1-12
The Last Phantom Annual #1
Merciless: The Rise of Ming #1-4
Red Sonja Annual #4
The Shadow Special #1
Sherlock Holmes: Year One #1-6

Dynamite Entertainment Collected Editions 
Buck Rogers: Volume One - Future Shock Hardcover
Buck Rogers: Volume One - Future Shock Trade Paperback
Buck Rogers: Volume Two - From the Earth to the Moon Trade Paperback
The Last Phantom: Volume One - Ghost Walk Trade Paperback
The Last Phantom: Volume Two - Jungle Rules Trade Paperback
Merciless: The Rise of Ming Trade Paperback
Red Sonja: Travels Volume Two Trade Paperback
Sherlock Holmes: Year One Trade Paperback
Sherlock Holmes Omnibus Volume One Trade Paperback

Dynamite Entertainment Foreign Language Editions 
Buck Rogers: Volume One - Shock Futuro Trade Paperback (Planeta DeAgostini - Italian)
O Ultimo Fantasma: O Jornada Do Espirito Trade Paperback (Mythos Books - Brazil/Portuguese)
O Ultimo Fantasma: A Lei Da Selva Trade Paperback (Mythos Books - Brazil/Portuguese)
Sherlock Holmes: Ano Um Trade Paperback (Pixel - Brazil/Portuguese)
Sherlock Holmes: Les Origines Volumes 1-2 (Soleil U.S. Comics - French)

IDW Entertainment 
Beatty's writing credits for IDW Entertainment include the following:

G.I. Joe: Origins #13-14
Star Wars Adventures: Destroyer Down (2017 Loot Crate Exclusive Graphic Novel)
Star Wars Adventures: Destroyer Down #1-3 (Reprint of 2017 Loot Crate Exclusive Graphic Novel)

IDW Entertainment Collected Editions 
G.I. Joe: The IDW Collection Volume 2 Hardcover (Collects G.I. Joe Origins #13-14)
G.I. Joe: Origins Omnibus Volume 2 Trade Paperback (Collects G.I. Joe Origins #13-14)
G.I. Joe: Origins Volume 3 Trade Paperback (Collects G.I. Joe Origins #13-14)
Star Wars Adventures: Destroyer Down Digest-Sized Edition (Reprint of 2017 Loot Crate Exclusive Graphic Novel)

Marvel Entertainment 
Beatty's writing credits for Marvel Entertainment include the following:

Star Wars Legends Epic Collection: The Menace Revealed #2 Trade Paperback

Comic Book Character Creations 
During his comic book career, Beatty has co-created the following characters listed A to Z with writing collaborators and artist co-creators noted in parentheses following each:

DC Comics Characters 
The Aeronaut (Wildstorm - Number of the Beast - Co-created with artist Chris Sprouse)
Agent Fawkes (Detective Comics - Co-created with artist Jeff Parker)
A'monn A'mokk (Son of Vulcan - Co-created with artist Keron Grant)
A'morr (Son of Vulcan - Co-created with artist Keron Grant)
Barney Blaine (Son of Vulcan - Co-created with artist Keron Grant)
Black Anvil (Wildstorm - Number of the Beast - Co-created with artist Chris Sprouse)
Blitzkrieg (Detective Comics - Co-created with artist Jeff Parker)
Blur (Son of Vulcan - Co-created with artist Keron Grant)
Breakdown (a.k.a. "Goo") (Wildstorm - Gen13 - Co-created with artist Dan Hipp)
Buster (Son of Vulcan - Co-created with artist Keron Grant)
Charliehorse (Son of Vulcan - Co-created with artist Keron Grant)
The Coalition of Crime (Son of Vulcan - Co-created with artist Keron Grant)
Daughter of Vulcan (Legion of Super-Heroes in the 31st Century - Co-created with artist Sanford Greene)
Dino-Mite II (Son of Vulcan - Co-created with artist Keron Grant)
Ditto (Wildstorm - Gen13 - Co-created with artist Dan Hipp)
Doctor Sin (Wildstorm - Number of the Beast - Co-created with artist Chris Sprouse)
Endless Winter (JSA Classified - Co-created with Mike Carlin and artist Rags Morales)
Engine Joe (Wildstorm - Number of the Beast - Co-created with artist Chris Sprouse)
Falconette (Wildstorm - Number of the Beast - Co-created with artist Chris Sprouse)
The Fearsmiths (Wildstorm - Number of the Beast - Co-created with artist Chris Sprouse)
Felix Desidero (Batman: Gotham Knights - Co-created with artist Roger Robinson)
Fishmonger (Son of Vulcan - Co-created with artist Keron Grant)
Flex (Son of Vulcan - Co-created with artist Keron Grant)
Frag (Joker: Last Laugh - Co-created with Chuck Dixon and artist Marcos Martin)
Green Lantern Alisand'r (Green Lantern 80-Page Giant #3 - Co-created with artist Graham Nolan)
Green Lantern Ash-Pak-Glif (Green Lantern 80-Page Giant #3 - Co-created with artist Graham Nolan)
Green Lantern B'shi (Green Lantern 80-Page Giant #3 - Co-created with artist Mike Lilly)
Green Lantern Kendotha Kr'nek (Green Lantern 80-Page Giant #3 - Co-created with artist Joyce Chin)
Green Lantern Raker Qarrigat (Green Lantern 80-Page Giant #3 - Co-created with artist Graham Nolan)
Gudra the Valkyrie (Detective Comics - Co-created with artist Jeff Parker)
Hardbody (Wildstorm - Gen13 - Co-created with artist Dan Hipp)
Honeybee (Wildstorm - Number of the Beast - Co-created with artist Chris Sprouse)
Hotfoot (Wildstorm - Number of the Beast - Co-created with artist Chris Sprouse)
Invulnera-Boy (Legion of Super-Heroes in the 31st Century - Co-created with artist Sanford Greene)
Iron Curtain (Detective Comics - Co-created with artist Jeff Parker)
Johnny Photon (Wildstorm - Number of the Beast - Co-created with artist Chris Sprouse)
Kid Kobra (Robin - Co-created with writer Chuck Dixon and artists Andy Kuhn & Pete Woods)
Little B.U.D.D.Y. (Son of Vulcan - Co-created with artist Keron Grant)
Mago (Wildstorm - Number of the Beast - Co-created with artist Chris Sprouse)
Midnight Rider (Wildstorm - Number of the Beast - Co-created with artist Chris Sprouse)
Mite (Wildstorm - Number of the Beast - Co-created with artist Chris Sprouse)
Monkey-in-the-Middle (Son of Vulcan - Co-created with artist Keron Grant)
Neandra (Wildstorm - Number of the Beast - Co-created with artist Chris Sprouse)
Nightmary (Wildstorm - Gen13 - Co-created with artist Mike Huddleston)
The Paladins (Wildstorm - Number of the Beast - Co-created with artist Chris Sprouse)
Pandora (Son of Vulcan - Co-created with artist Keron Grant)
Patrick Morgan Wayne (Bruce Wayne's paternal grandfather - Batman Secret Files & Origins #1)
Petrified Girl (Wildstorm - Number of the Beast - Co-created with artist Chris Sprouse)
Pix (Batman: Gotham Knights - Co-created with artist Roger Robinson)
Praetor (Son of Vulcan - Co-created with artist Keron Grant)
Private Warr (Wildstorm - Number of the Beast - Co-created with artist Chris Sprouse)
Quaker (Son of Vulcan - Co-created with artist Keron Grant)
Ragamuffin (Wildstorm - Number of the Beast - Co-created with artist Chris Sprouse)
Rancor (Joker: Last Laugh - Co-created with Chuck Dixon and artist Pete Woods)
Redeemer (Wildstorm - Number of the Beast - Co-created with artist Chris Sprouse)
Red Scare (Detective Comics - Co-created with artist Jeff Parker)
Runt (Wildstorm Gen13 - Co-created with artist Dan Hipp)
Sapling (Son of Vulcan - Co-created with artist Keron Grant)
Scramjet (Son of Vulcan - Co-created with artist Keron Grant)
Seafarer (Wildstorm - Number of the Beast - Co-created with artist Chris Sprouse)
Shrike II (Robin: Year One - Co-created with Chuck Dixon and artist Marcos Martin)
Shrike III (Robin: Year One - Co-created with Chuck Dixon and artist Marcos Martin)
Silhouette (Son of Vulcan - Co-created with artist Keron Grant)
Skeleton Crew (Wildstorm - Number of the Beast - Co-created with artist Chris Sprouse)
Son of Vulcan II (Miguel Devante) (Son of Vulcan - Co-created with artist Keron Grant / Re-Imagining of Charlton Comics Character)
Stinkbug (Wildstorm - Number of the Beast - Co-created with artist Chris Sprouse)
Stormfront (Joker: Last Laugh - Co-created with Chuck Dixon and artist Andy Kuhn)
Strongarm (JSA Classified - Co-created with artist Rags Morales)
Taipan (Wildstorm - Number of the Beast - Co-created with artist Chris Sprouse)
Third Rail (Wildstorm - Number of the Beast - Co-created with artist Chris Sprouse)
Thrush (Wildstorm - Number of the Beast - Co-created with artist Chris Sprouse)
Tumbleweed (Wildstorm - Number of the Beast - Co-created with artist Chris Sprouse)
Urumi (Wildstorm - Number of the Beast - Co-created with artist Chris Sprouse)
Vulcan (Erich Thonius) (Son of Vulcan - Co-created with artist Keron Grant)
Wallflower (Wildstorm - Number of the Beast - Co-created with artist Chris Sprouse)
Warjack (Joker: Last Laugh - Co-created with Chuck Dixon and artist Andy Kuhn)
Windsprint (Wildstorm - Gen13 - Co-created with artist Dan Hipp)
Witchazel (Son of Vulcan - Co-created with artist Keron Grant)

STAR WARS Comic Book Characters & Concepts 
Admiral Ektol Traz (Star Wars Adventures: Destroyer Down - Co-created with artist Jon Sommariva)
Bak Rychuk (Star Wars Adventures: Destroyer Down - Co-created with artist Jon Sommariva)
Er'stacians (Aquatic inhabitants of Er'stacia, a planet located beyond the Galactic Rim in so-called "Wild Space")
Hopeata (Star Wars Adventures: Destroyer Down - Co-created with artist Jon Sommariva)
Imperial Star Destroyer Spectral (Star Wars Adventures: Destroyer Down - Co-created with artist Derek Charm)
K-8Z8 (Imperial Security Droid) (Star Wars Adventures: Destroyer Down - Co-created with artist Derek Charm)
Noblesse Eiram (Star Wars Adventures: Destroyer Down - Co-created with artist Jon Sommariva)
Olee Beasco (Star Wars Adventures: Destroyer Down - Co-created with artist Jon Sommariva)
Shepherd Squadron - New Republic Fighter Wing (Star Wars Adventures: Destroyer Down - Co-created with artist Jon Sommariva)
Yancee Drai (Star Wars Adventures: Destroyer Down - Co-created with artist Jon Sommariva)
Z2-Z2 (Zeetoo-Zeetoo Astromech Droid) (Star Wars Adventures: Destroyer Down - Co-created with artist Jon Sommariva)

Notes

References

External links

Articles & Interviews
DIALOGUE TO FOLLOW... Author & Comic Book Writer Scott Beatty's Blog!
BATGIRL WEEK: "Young Heroes in Love" by Scott Beatty - 13th Dimension
Scott Beatty on "Six Stories That Changed How I Read (and Write) Comics" - CBR.com
"Star Wars Toys Were Everything - But Hardly the One Thing" by Scott Beatty - 13th Dimension
Scott Beatty Talks Ming's "Merciless" New Series - MTV.com
The Last Phantom Interview with Scott Beatty - The Chronicle Chamber
Comics Historian and Writer Scott Beatty Discusses the Future of the Industry - Fanboy Nation

Living people
American comics writers
Year of birth missing (living people)